Strophurus jeanae, also known commonly as the southern phasmid gecko and Jean's spiny-tailed gecko, is a species of gecko, a lizard in the family Gekkonidae. The species is endemic to Australia.

Etymology
The specific name, jeanae, is in honor of Miss Jean White, Department of Ornithology and Herpetology, Western Australian Museum.

Geographic range
In Australia S. jeanae is found in northern Northern Territory and  northern Western Australia.

Habitat
The preferred habitat of S. jeanae is arid zones.

Reproduction
S. jeanae is oviparous.

References

Further reading
Cogger HG (2014). Reptiles and Amphibians of Australia, Seventh Edition. Clayton, Victoria, Australia: CSIRO Publishing. xxx + 1,033 pp. .
Greer AE (1989). The Biology and Evolution of Australian Lizards. Chipping Norton, New South Wales: Surrey Beatty & Sons. 264 pp. (Strophurus jeanae, new combination).
Storr GM (1988). "A new species of Diplodactylus (Lacertilia: Gekkonidae) from northern Australia". Records of the Western Australian Museum 14 (2): 183–187. (Diplodactylus jeanae, new species).

Strophurus
Reptiles described in 1988
Taxa named by Glen Milton Storr
Geckos of Australia

Oliver P